Jean-Yves Chay (born 8 April 1948) is a French football manager and former goalkeeper. He was most recently manager of Annecy FC in the French Championnat National.

He has previously played for FC Gueugnon and coached some French clubs such as SCO Angers and FC Gueugnon and  JS Kabylie. He was appointed coach of Raja Casablanca in 2007.

Honours

Managerial
JS Kabylie
 CAF Cup: 2002
 Algerian League: 2006

References

1948 births
Living people
Association football goalkeepers
French footballers
FC Gueugnon players
FC Montceau Bourgogne players
French football managers
FC Gueugnon managers
Stade Gabèsien managers
US Monastir (football) managers
Angers SCO managers
Niger national football team managers
JS Kabylie managers
Raja CA managers
JSM Béjaïa managers
Thonon Evian Grand Genève F.C. managers
FC Annecy managers
French expatriate football managers
Expatriate football managers in Tunisia
French expatriate sportspeople in Tunisia
Expatriate football managers in Algeria
French expatriate sportspeople in Algeria
Expatriate football managers in Morocco
French expatriate sportspeople in Morocco
Algerian Ligue Professionnelle 1 managers
Botola managers